Messages is the debut studio album by English singer and musician Steve Swindells, released in 1974 (see 1974 in music). Produced by his manager Mark Edwards, Swindells felt the production poor despite the presence of quality musicians.

A follow up album Swallows was recorded, mastered and test pressings manufactured, but "Edwards had blown Steve’s deal with RCA by sweeping everything off the managing director’s desk with his umbrella in a drunken/druggy rage". The 2009 re-issue of the album includes a bonus CD of this previously unreleased second album.

Track listing 
All tracks written by Steve Swindells
 "Miles Away Again"
 "Energy Crisis"
 "The Earl's Court Case"
 "Living in Sin"
 "I Don't Like Eating Meat"
 "Shake Up Your Soul"
 "Surrender"
 "I Can't See Where the Light Switch Is"
 "Messages From Heaven"

Swindells Swallow 
 "Flash In The Pan"
 "The Walking Song"
 "When The Clapperboard Has Clapped"
 "Easy On The Night"
 "Dealing With The Feeling"
 "Better Times Are Here"
 "Doodiboogie"
 "The Last One To Know"

Personnel 
 Steve Swindells – Keyboards, Vocals  
 Bruce Knapp – Guitar  
 Mark Warner – Guitar  
 Caleb Quaye – Guitar  
 Danny Thompson – Bass  
 Dave Wintour – Bass  
 John Gustafson – Bass  
 Barry DeSouza – Drums  
 Michael Giles – Drums  
 Morris Pert – Percussion  
 Chris Mercer – Saxophone  
 Barry St. John – Vocals  
 Rosetta Hightower – Vocals  
 Doris Troy – Vocals  
 Mountain Fjord Orchestra Orchestra
 Mohamed Shinan - bass

Release details 
 1974 – RCA Victor – UK: LPLI5057
 Single released: "Energy Crisis" / "Shake Up Your Soul"
 2009 – Esoteric Records – UK: ECLEC2163 link

References 

1974 debut albums
Steve Swindells albums
RCA Records albums